Founded in 1980, Zaccho Dance Theatre is a San Francisco-based dance company.  The company presents site-specific works as well as works inspired by environmental, cultural, and structural settings.  Zaccho's co-founder and artistic director, Joanna Haigood, is the company's primary choreographer.  The company has performed at prestigious festivals and art centers including the National Black Arts Festival, Fall for Dance Festival, Festival d'Avignon in France, Jacob's Pillow Dance Festival, the Walker Arts Center, and the McColl Center for Visual Art.  The company also runs a free arts education program for students age 7 to 17 at its studio in Bayview-Hunters Point, San Francisco.

References 
Zaccho Dance Theatre Official Website
New York Times review of Zaccho Dance Theatre performing "Picture Red Hook" in 2002
New York Times review of Zaccho Dance Theatre performing "Invisible Wings" in 2007

External links 
Archival footage of Zaccho Dance Theatre performing Joanna Haigood's site-specific work "Invisible Wings" at Jacobs Pillow in 1998
Archival footage of historian Eric Foner discussing the Underground Railroad in relation to Joanna Haigood's site-specific "Invisible Wings" and Jacob's Pillow Dance Festival in August 25, 2007

1980 establishments in California
501(c)(3) organizations
Culture of San Francisco
Dance companies in the United States
Non-profit organizations based in San Francisco
Arts organizations established in 1980
Dance in California
Performance art in California